André Sicard (19 February 1915 – 30 November 1973) was a French long-distance runner who specialised in the 10 km. In this event he finished 19th at the 1936 Summer Olympics and 8th at the 1938 European Championships. Sicard won individual and team silver medals at the 1937 International Cross Country Championships.

References

External links 
 

1915 births
1973 deaths
People from Niort
French male long-distance runners
Olympic athletes of France
Athletes (track and field) at the 1936 Summer Olympics
Sportspeople from Deux-Sèvres